L & L Tavern at 3207 N. Clark Street (at Belmont Avenue), in the Lakeview neighborhood in Chicago was "named one of the best dive bars in the nation by the frat-tastic legions of Stuff Magazine."

When it opened was by Paul Gillon in the 1950s, it was called the Columbia Tavern & Liquors. Its current name comes from prior owners Lefty (John Miller) and Lauretta. It is currently owned by Ken Frandsen.

The bar attracts a mixed crowd.

Serial killers 
 When Jeffrey Dahmer was arrested, L&L employee Frankie—whom Dahmer hit on—said "Oh my god! That's the guy that used to drink in the corner by the window and 'chickenhawk' the Dunkin' Donuts across the street!"
 John Wayne Gacy is rumored to have shown up in full clown outfit back in the '70s.

In popular media 
 Interviews in the tavern feature substantially in Against Me!'s We're Never Going Home.
 A song on Lawrence Arms' A Guided Tour of Chicago (1999) is entitled "The Northside, the L&L, and Any Number of Crappy Apartments."
 Anthony Bourdain visited the L and L for his Travel Channel series The Layover (Season 2, Episode 1 "Chicago").
 The L and L is a shooting location for the HBO series Lovecraft Country.

References

External links 
 L&L Tavern at Centerstage
 L&L Tavern at Planet99

Companies based in Chicago